David Felton (born 1967), known professionally as Gravy, is an American guitarist who is best known as a member of the Cleveland, Ohio-based heavy metal band Mushroomhead. He currently plays in another Cleveland-based heavy metal band KRIADIAZ.

Biography 
He also plays guitar for a metal cover band called S.O.S., a short stint in Jeff Hatrix's hair metal band Purgatory, Hatrix, and for the hardcore band (216).

Gravy's brother Steve Felton plays drums for Mushroomhead. Gravy wears a mummy-like mask based on the character from a horror movie with Xs on it (which are often painted with different colors of make up.)

Dave has finished a solo project CD titled "Daves Heavy Duty Demo" and has recorded several tracks with Mushroomhead frontman, J Mann.

Dave's earliest recorded work was with another Cleveland based band called "Centurion". The album was titled "Cross and Black", recorded in 1985.

Equipment 
Custom Ibanez RG7420
Ibanez Universe
Peavey 5150 Series amplifier
Marshall 800 series amplifier
Randall Titan amplifier
Randall XL cabinets
Yngwie Malmsteen overdrive pedal
D0D-308 pedal
Ibanez tube screamer

References

External links 
Interview with Gravy at Ultimate-Guitar.com
Dave's cover band SOS
Centurion

Living people
American industrial musicians
Guitarists from Ohio
American heavy metal musicians
Place of birth missing (living people)
American rock guitarists
American male guitarists
Seven-string guitarists
1967 births
20th-century American guitarists
20th-century American male musicians